Mario Cuitláhuac Castañeda Partida (born June 29, 1962 in Irapuato, Guanajuato, Mexico), known professionally as Mario Castañeda, is a Mexican voice actor and dubbing director known for his voice work in Japanese anime, such as Son Goku in the Latin American Spanish dub of Dragon Ball Z, as well as the dubbing voice of many actors in movies, including Jim Carrey, Jackie Chan and Bruce Willis.

Early life and education
When he was very young, his parents moved to Mexico City where he resides currently. He studied drama in the Andrés Soler Institute from 1979 to 1982.

Career
In June 1983, Castañeda started to work as a voice actor in Mexican dubs of several television series, including Diff'rent Strokes, The Powers of Matthew Star, and The Visitor. Castañeda has also done voice work in Japanese anime, such as Son Goku in the Latin American dub of Dragon Ball Z, as well as the dubbing voice of many actors in movies, including Jim Carrey, Jackie Chan and Bruce Willis. He was also the announcer for Boomerang in Latin America from 2001 to 2006.

Notable roles

Anime dubbing
Blue Submarine - Tokuhiro Iga
Bakugan Battle Brawlers - Darkus Exedra, Darkus Razenoid.
Dragon Ball/Dragon Ball Z/Dragon Ball Z: Bardock - The Father of Goku/Dragon Ball GT/Dragon Ball Super - Son Goku (adult), Bardock (Goku's father), Turles
Saint Seiya - Sea Dragon Kanon (Poseidon and Hades Chapter Inferno - TV version)
Los Caballeros del Zodíaco - Lune de Balrog (Hades Chapter inferno - DVD version)
Naruto Shippuden - Hidan
One Piece - Akainu/Sakazuki
Sailor Moon - Neflyte
Slam Dunk - Tatsuhiko Aota, Toru Hanagata.

Animation dubbing 

Ace Ventura: Detective de Mascotas - Ace Ventura
Anastasia - Dmitri
DuckTales: Remastered - Babyface Beagle/Robocop 159-203
MacGyver - MacGyver 
 
El Chavo - Don Ramon / Ñoño
Iron Man - Tony Stark/Iron Man
Spider-Man - Tony Stark/Iron Man
 Up - Alpha
 Cars 2 - Acer 
The Incredible Hulk - Tony Stark/Iron Man
Demolition Man - Simon Phoenix
The Mask - Stanley Ipkiss/La Máscara (Stanley Ipkiss/The Mask) and Ace Ventura
Captain Planet - Capitán Planeta (Captain Planet)
Yo Yogi! - Yogi Bear
Harvey Birdman: Attorney at Law - Droopy
Tom and Jerry Kids - Lobo/Droopy/Dripple
Thomas & Friends - James the Red Engine (Seasons 13-onwards)
Futurama - Zapp Branigan
Bruce Almighty - Bruce Nolan
The Wonder Years - Kevin Arnold (Adult)
Boyz n the Hood - Ricky (Adult)
Transformers - Glen Whitmann
You, Me and Dupree - Carl
Hannah Montana - Robbie Steward
Dragonball Evolution - Goku
Dueños de la Noche - Capt. Joseph 'Joe' Grusinsky
Anacondas: Trail of Blood - Scott
The Avengers: Earth's Mightiest Heroes - Ant-Man/Giant-Man/Hank Pym
Saw (franchise) - Eric Matthews (DVD Version)/Art Blank
Kitty Is Not a Cat - Cheeta
 Handy Manny - Pat

References

External links
 

 

1962 births
Living people
People from Irapuato
Mexican voice directors
Mexican male voice actors
Male actors from Guanajuato